Vladimir Afanasyevich Lyakhov (20 July 1941 – 19 April 2018) was a Ukrainian Soviet cosmonaut.

He was selected as cosmonaut on 5 May 1967, and retired on 7 September 1994. Lyakhov was the Commander on Soyuz 32, Soyuz T-9, and Soyuz TM-6, and spent 333 days, 7 hours, 47 minutes in space. He was married and had two children.

He was awarded:
Twice Hero of the Soviet Union;
Pilot-Cosmonaut of the USSR;
Two Orders of Lenin;
Order of the October Revolution;
Medal "For Merit in Space Exploration" (Russian Federation);
Order of Sukhbaatar (Mongolia);
Order "The Sun of Liberty" (Afghanistan);
Order of Merit 3rd class (Ukraine).

External links
http://www.spacefacts.de/bios/cosmonauts/english/lyakhov_vladimir.htm
https://web.archive.org/web/20100131144611/http://astronautix.com/astros/lyakhov.htm
The official website of the city administration Baikonur - Honorary citizens of Baikonur
 Vladimir Lykahkov, Soviet cosmonaut who flew to three space stations, dies at 76, CollectSpace.com, April 2018

1941 births
2018 deaths
People from Antratsyt
Russian people of Ukrainian descent
Heroes of the Soviet Union
Soviet cosmonauts
Recipients of the Order of Lenin
Recipients of the Medal "For Merit in Space Exploration"
Recipients of the Order of Merit (Ukraine), 3rd class
Salyut program cosmonauts
Spacewalkers
Mir crew members
Laureates of the State Prize of Ukraine in Science and Technology